The Murrieta Hogbacks are Miocene basalt capped granitic hogbacks located in northeastern Murrieta on the southern end of the Temescal Mountains of Riverside County, California.

Geology
The Murrieta Hogbacks are underlain by Cretaceous granitic rocks of the Peninsular Ranges Batholith.  On the north half of the hogbacks, by foliated biotite-hornblende tonalite and on the southern half by hornblende gabbro. The basalt is potassium-argon dated to 10.4 to 10.8 million years and is a remnant of a channel-filling basalt flow, overlying a thin deposit of unconsolidated gray stream gravel, indicating that the basalt had filled in a former water course.

References

Mountains of Riverside County, California
Temescal Mountains
Mountains of Southern California